Yala may refer to:

Places 
 Yala, Ivory Coast, a village
 Yala, Kenya, a town in Siaya County, Kenya
 Lalitpur, Nepal, also known as Yala
 Yala, Nigeria, a Local Government Area in Cross River State
 Yala National Park, Sri Lanka
 Yala Province, Thailand
 Yala, Thailand, its administrative capital
 Amphoe Mueang Yala, capital district of the province of Yala

Music 
 "Y.A.L.A.", a 2013 song by M.I.A.
 Y.A.L.A, a 2018 album by Genetikk

Other uses 
 Yala language, an African language spoken in the Niger-Congo area
 Yala (moth), a genus of moth in the family Geometridae
 Yala, a goddess in the CrossGen comicbook series The First
 Yala River, a river in western Kenya

See also 
 Yalla (disambiguation)